Horace Green Hutchins (July 20, 1811 – April 7, 1877) was a Massachusetts politician who served as the seventh mayor of  Charlestown, Massachusetts.

Early life and education
Hutchins was born in Bath, New Hampshire on July 20, 1811 to Hon. Samuel and Rosanna (Childs) Hutchins. Hutchins graduated from Phillips Exeter Academy in 1830.  He then attended Dartmouth College, where he graduated with an A.M. degree in 1835.  Hutchins studied law with Rufus Choate and at Harvard.  In October 1839 Hutchins was admitted to the Massachusetts bar. On October 22, 1844, Hutchins married Julia Hanna Hurd, the daughter of John Hurd of Boston.

Political offices
Hutchens was elected to represent Chalestown's Ward 1 in the city's Common Council for the term beginning 1854, he served as a member of the Common Council from 1854 to 1857. Hutchens served as President of the Charlestown Common Council from 1855 to 1857, Hutchins was the mayor of Charlestown in 1861.

Notes

1811 births
1877 deaths
Dartmouth College alumni
Massachusetts city council members
Mayors of Charlestown, Massachusetts
Harvard Law School alumni
19th-century American politicians
Phillips Exeter Academy alumni
People from Bath, New Hampshire